The Men's K-2 500m event at the 2010 South American Games was held over March 28 at 10:40.

Medalists

Results

References
Final

500m K-2 Men